Degaña  is one of three parishes (administrative divisions) in the Degaña municipality, within the province and autonomous community of Asturias, in northern Spain.

The population is 388 (INE 2007).

Villages
 Degaña
 Fonduveigas
 El Reboḷḷal

References

Parishes in Degaña